John Yuill (born 1915, date of death unknown) was a professional footballer, who played for Huddersfield Town, Cheltenham Town and Arbroath. Yuill is deceased.

References

Sources

1915 births
Year of death missing
Scottish footballers
Footballers from North Lanarkshire
Association football midfielders
English Football League players
Huddersfield Town A.F.C. players
Arbroath F.C. players
Cheltenham Town F.C. players
Sportspeople from Wishaw